Lakshmi (1962) is an Ollywood / Oriya film directed by SP Naik, under the technical supervision of Binoy Banerjee

Cast
 Gour Prasad Ghose
 Parbati Ghose
 Dayanidhi Das

Awards
National Film Awards
 1962: Certificate of Merit for Second Best Feature Film in Oriya

References

External links 
 

1962 films
1960s Odia-language films